Henry Ross Pears (28 July 1877 – 20 April 1912) was an Australian rules footballer who played for the Collingwood Football Club in the Victorian Football League (VFL).

Family
The son of Thomas Charles Pears (1825-1883), and Catherine "Kate" Pears (1849-1930), née Mahoney, Henry Ross Pears was born in Geelong on 28 July 1877.

Football
Although primarily a half forward flanker and forward pocket, Pears (known as "Midget") also spent some time as a rover.

Port Melbourne (VFA)
He played 33 Games (27 goals) for Port Melbourne over four seasons (1898-1901).

Collingwood (VFL)
He played 95 Games (78 goals) for Collingwood over seven seasons (1898-1901).

He kicked seven goals in a game against Geelong in his debut season and was a member of Collingwood's 1902 and 1903 premiership teams. Pears also played in a losing Grand Final in 1905.

Brunswick (VFA)
In July 1908, he was cleared from Collingwood to Brunswick, and went on to play 35 Games (14 goals) for Brunswick over three seasons (1908-1910).

Death
Pears died on 20 April 1912, after playing a pre-season game for Port Melbourne.

Notes

References
 Holmesby, Russell and Main, Jim (2007). The Encyclopedia of AFL Footballers. 7th ed. Melbourne: Bas Publishing.

External links
 
 

1877 births
1912 deaths
Sport deaths in Australia
Australian rules footballers from Victoria (Australia)
Australian Rules footballers: place kick exponents
Collingwood Football Club players
Collingwood Football Club Premiership players
Port Melbourne Football Club players
Brunswick Football Club players
Two-time VFL/AFL Premiership players